The Pennsylvania State League was an American minor league baseball sports league that operated from 1892 to 1895, then became the first Atlantic League. The league member teams were exclusively based in Pennsylvania.

Cities represented
Allentown, PA:  Allentown Colts 1892–1893; Allentown Kelly's Killers 1894; Allentown Goobers 1895; Allentown 1895
Altoona, PA:  Altoona 1892; Altoona Mud Turtles 1893; Altoona 1894
Ashland, PA:  Ashland 1894
Carbondale, PA:  Carbondale Anthracites 1895
Danville, PA:  Danville 1892–1893
Easton, PA:  Easton Dutchmen 1893–1894; Easton 1894
Harrisburg, PA:  Harrisburg Hustlers 1893; Harrisburg Senators 1894–1895
Hazleton, PA:  Hazleton Barons 1894; Hazleton Quay-kers 1895
Johnstown, PA:  Johnstown Johnnies 1892; Johnstown Terrors 1893
Lancaster, PA:  Lancaster Chicks 1894–1895
Lebanon, PA:  Lebanon Pretzel Eaters 1892
Philadelphia, PA:  Philadelphia Colts 1894
Pottsville, PA:  Pottsville Colts 1894–1895
Reading, PA:  Reading Actives 1892; Reading Actives 1893–1895; Reading 1895
Scranton, PA:  Scranton Miners 1892–1893; Scranton Indians 1894
Shenandoah, PA: Shenandoah 1894; Shenandoah Huns 1895
Wilkes-Barre, PA:  Wilkes-Barre Coal Barons 1892
York, PA:  York White Roses 1893

Standings and statistics
1892 Pennsylvania State League

Lebanon and Reading disbanded. 

1893 Pennsylvania State League

Danville (5–47) moved to Reading July 7. Playoff: Johnstown 3 games, Easton 2. Easton refused to continue the series.

1894 Pennsylvania State League

Easton (8–36) moved to Philadelphia July 4; Altoona (17–31)  moved to Lancaster July 7; Scranton (45–28) was replaced by Shenandoah August 12; Allentown (53–29) was replaced by Easton August 16; Easton (0–8) moved to Ashland Sept. 1.Playoff: Pottsville defeated Harrisburg in a disputed title game.   

1895 Pennsylvania State League

Shenandoah disbanded May 20; Harrisburg disbanded June 20; Reading disbanded July 20; Allentown disbanded July 24; Pottsville (35–33) moved to Allentown July 27; Allentown (5–7) moved to Reading August 10.Playoff: None Scheduled

Sources
The Encyclopedia of Minor League Baseball: Second Edition.

Defunct minor baseball leagues in the United States
Baseball leagues in Pennsylvania
Sports leagues established in 1892
Sports leagues disestablished in 1895